Matthew David Sonczak (born 5 September 1998) is an English cricketer. He made his first-class debut for Derbyshire against the West Indies on 11 August 2017 during their tour of England.

References

External links
 
 

1998 births
Living people
English cricketers
Derbyshire cricketers
People from Hadfield, Derbyshire
Cricketers from Derbyshire